Sir Stanley Eugene Gomes was a Guyanese Judge who was Chief Justice of Barbados and Trinidad and Tobago.

He was appointed Attorney General of the Leeward Islands before August 1945. He then served as Chief Justice of Barbados from 1957 to 1958 and Chief Justice of Trinidad and Tobago from 1958 to 1960. He was knighted in 1959.

In August 1961 he was appointed Chief Justice of the newly established West Indies Federation. The Federation was dissolved in May 1962.

References

Guyanese expatriates in Barbados
Chief justices of Barbados
Chief justices of Trinidad and Tobago
Guyanese people of World War II
British Leeward Islands people of World War II
British Leeward Islands judges
British Trinidad and Tobago judges
West Indies Federation judges
Colony of Barbados judges
Guyanese expatriates in Trinidad and Tobago